The 2011–12 Atlantic 10 Conference men's basketball season marked the 36th season of Atlantic 10 Conference basketball. The 2012 Atlantic 10 men's basketball tournament was held for the sixth straight year at Boardwalk Hall in Atlantic City, New Jersey.

Preseason
Atlantic 10 media day was held on October 13, 2011. Xavier, who had won at least a share of the last five regular season championships, was chosen as the preseason favorite by coaches and the media. They received 18 first-place votes, while Temple received four first-place votes and finished in second. Xavier's Tu Holloway was the reigning player of the year, having won the honor in the 2010–11 Atlantic 10 Conference men's basketball season.

Atlantic 10 preseason poll

Atlantic 10 preseason teams

Preseason watchlists

Rankings

Conference awards & honors

Weekly honors
Throughout the conference regular season, the Atlantic 10 offices name a player of the week and rookie of the week each Monday.

Atlantic 10 All-Conference teams

References